Indian-Sri Lankan or Sri Lankan-Indian may refer to:
As an adjective, anything relating to India – Sri Lanka relations
Indians in Sri Lanka
Indian Tamils of Sri Lanka
Sri Lankans in India
Sri Lankan Tamils in India